Michael O'Rourke (1946 – 26 January 2019) was an Irish Gaelic footballer and hurler who played for club side Killeigh and at inter-county level with the Offaly senior football team. He usually lined out at left corner-back but could also be deployed as a forward.

Career
O'Rourke first came to prominence as a member of the Offaly minor team that won the 1964 All-Ireland Championship. He later lined out for the Offaly under-21 and junior teams before making his senior debut against Laois in the 1968 Leinster Championship. O'Rourke had his greatest successes with Offaly as a defender on the teams that won All-Ireland Championship titles in 1971 and 1972. He also won four Leinster Championship medals and lined out for the Offaly senior hurling team during the 1975–76 National League before retiring from inter-county activity in 1976.

Death
O'Rourke died on 26 January 2019.

Honours
Offaly
All-Ireland Senior Football Championship (2): 1971, 1972
Leinster Senior Football Championship (4): 1969, 1971, 1972, 1973
All-Ireland Minor Football Championship (1): 1964
Leinster Minor Football Championship (1): 1964

References

1946 births
2019 deaths
Dual players
Gaelic football selectors
Offaly inter-county Gaelic footballers
Offaly inter-county hurlers